Solanum heterodoxum, the melonleaf nightshade, is a species of flowering plant in the family Solanaceae. It is native to Mexico and the US state of New Mexico, and has been introduced to Bulgaria. Solanum heterodoxum var. setigeroides is now considered to be a full species, Solanum setigeroides, native to more northerly areas of the United States than S.heterodoxum.

Subtaxa
The following variety is accepted:
Solanum heterodoxum var. heterodoxum

References

heterodoxum
Flora of New Mexico
Flora of Mexico
Plants described in 1813